Robert Muir "Roy" Kinnear (3 February 1904 – 22 September 1942) was a Scottish dual-code international rugby union, and professional rugby league footballer who played in the 1920s and 1930s.
His son was the character actor, Roy Kinnear, and his grandson is the actor Rory Kinnear.

Biography
He played club level rugby union (RU) for Heriot's Rugby Club as a Centre, i.e. number 12 or 13, Kinnear won caps for Scotland in 1926 against France, Wales, and Ireland, won caps for British and Irish Lions while at Heriot's Rugby Club in 1924 against South Africa (4 matches). He was unique amongst Scottish rugby union defectors in that he originally played for a former pupils (FP) club, rather than one of the Border teams.

He played right-, i.e. number 3, in Wigan's 5–4 victory over Widnes in the 1928 Lancashire County Cup Final during the 1928–29 season at Wilderspool Stadium, Warrington on Saturday 24 November 1928.

Kinnear played left-, i.e. number 4, and scored a try in Wigan's 13–2 victory over Dewsbury in the 1928–29 Northern Rugby Football League season's Challenge Cup Final at Wembley Stadium, London on Saturday 4 May 1929.

He won caps for Other Nationalities (RL) while at Wigan in 1929 against England, in 1930 against England (2 matches), and won a cap for Great Britain (RL) while at Wigan in 1929 against Australia.

He scored 81 tries in 182 games for Wigan.

He collapsed and died while playing rugby union with the RAF during World War II in 1942, aged 38.

The Scotland Rugby League Student Player of the Year Award is named after him.

See also
 List of Scottish rugby union players killed in World War II

Sources
 Bath, Richard (ed.), The Scotland Rugby Miscellany (Vision Sports Publishing Ltd, 2007 )
 Massie, Allan, A Portrait of Scottish Rugby (Polygon, Edinburgh)

References

External links
!Great Britain Statistics at englandrl.co.uk (statistics currently missing due to not having appeared for both Great Britain, and England)
Statistics at wigan.rlfans.com

1904 births
1942 deaths
British & Irish Lions rugby union players from Scotland
Royal Air Force personnel killed in World War II
Dual-code rugby internationals
Great Britain national rugby league team players
Heriot's RC players
Other Nationalities rugby league team players
Royal Air Force airmen
Royal Air Force Volunteer Reserve personnel of World War II
Rugby league centres
Rugby league players from Edinburgh
Rugby union centres
Rugby union players from Edinburgh
Scotland international rugby union players
Scottish rugby league players
Scottish rugby union players
Sport deaths in England
Wigan Warriors players